The Black Prince is a Restoration era stage play, a historical tragedy written by Roger Boyle, 1st Earl of Orrery. It premiered on stage in 1667 and was first published in 1669. The play relied on influences from contemporaneous French theatre, and contributed to the evolution of the subgenre of heroic drama; yet it also looked back to the Caroline era to assimilate masque-like dramatic effects.

As its title indicates, the play deals with the historical career of Edward, the Black Prince and his defeat and capture of King John II of France at the Battle of Poitiers (1356).

The premiere was staged by the King's Company at the first Theatre Royal, Drury Lane on 19 October 1667. The opening performance was attended by many members of the English royal court, including the King: "Charles II and persons of the court gathered to honour the most distinguished playwright of the nobility." The production featured Edward Kynaston as the title character, Michael Mohun as King Edward III, William Wintershall as King John, Charles Hart as Lord Delaware, Nicholas Burt as Count Guesselin, William Beeston as Page and William Cartwright as Lord Latimer; Nell Gwyn as Alizia Pearce, Rebecca Marshall as Plantagenet, Mary Knep as Sevina and Katherine Corey as Cleorin.

Samuel Pepys attended the first and third performances of the play; he thought the drama itself was weak, but admired the staging.

The play was first printed in Two New Tragedies (1669), along with Boyle's Tryphon, by Henry Herringman. In the following year, it appeared again, in Four New Plays, a collection of Boyle's dramas, also from Herringman.

References

English Restoration plays
1667 plays
Plays about English royalty
Plays set in France
Plays set in the 14th century
Edward the Black Prince
Hundred Years' War in fiction
Tragedy plays
West End plays
Plays based on actual events
Plays based on real people